Tarigoppula Halt railway station (station code:TGU) is an Indian Railways station in the village of Tarigoppula of Krishna district in Andhra Pradesh. It lies on the Gudivada–Machilipatnam branch line, Vijayawada–Nidadavolu loop line and is administered under Vijayawada railway division of South Coast Railway zone.

Amenities 
It is one of the 65 standalone stations quipped with the unreserved ticketing system (UTS) in the division.

References 

Railway stations in Krishna district
Railway stations in Vijayawada railway division